Mary Anne Barkhouse  (born 1961) is a jeweller and sculptor residing in Haliburton, Ontario, Canada. She belongs to the Nimpkish band of the Kwakiutl First Nation.

Early life and education
Barkhouse was born in Vancouver, British Columbia, in 1961.  She is related to several notable artists from the Kwakwaka'wakw art tradition, including Ellen Neel, Mungo Martin, and Charlie James. She was a student of metalsmith Lois Betteridge. In the 1980s Barkhouse played bass with the Ottawa, Ontario punk band The Restless Virgins.

Career
Beginning her professional career in the 1990s, Barkhouse's artworks highlight modern environmental and indigenous concerns through the lens of personal and shared histories. Many of her works use animal imagery.

A major breakthrough work for Barkhouse was Harvest, completed in 2009. The mixed media sculpture was created for the 2009 The Muhheakantuck in Focus exhibition at Wave Hill in the Bronx, NY. It depicts the names of Indigenous groups of the Hudson valley on porcelain objects, laid out on a European-style table. A bronze coyote pulls at the tablecloth, giving the impression that the table service may crash to the ground. The piece was later acquired by the National Gallery of Canada, and has been loaned for touring exhibitions.

After separating from her former partner, the Ojibwe artist Michael Belmore, they continued to work together on artistic projects, including the public installation Echo in Toronto.

Barkhouse is a member of the Royal Canadian Academy of Arts.

Public Sculpture and Installation

Barkhouse has an extensive public sculpture practice. Her works are permanently installed in cities and institutions including the Thunder Bay Art Gallery, University of Western Ontario in London, the McMichael Canadian Art Collection, the Robert McLaughlin Gallery in Oshawa, Macdonald Stewart Art Centre in Guelph and the Millennium Walkway in Peterborough, Ontario.

A major early installation of Barkhouse's is Lichen, a collaboration with Michael Belmore. Installed at the McMichael Gallery in Vaughan, Ontario in 1998, it includes several bronze sculptures of wolves, and a transit shelter with a poster of a raven.

The McMaster Museum of Art in Hamilton, ON, permanently installed Covenant, a sculpture of two coyotes encountering each other, in 2012.

In 2013, The Canadian Museum of History installed 'namaxsala (To Travel in a Boat Together), a bronze and copper sculpture of a wolf in a canoe, staring across the Ottawa River at Parliament Hill. The work was inspired by a story told to Belmore by her grandfather.

Echo, installed in 2015 in Joel Weeks Park in Toronto, features three separate cast bronze sculptures. They include four squirrels worshiping an acorn, a beaver, and a fox.

Exhibitions
In 2017, the Koffler Centre of the Arts in Toronto organized a major solo exhibition of new and past works, Mary Anne Barkhouse: Le rêve aux loups, curated by Jennifer Rudder. The show toured with additional works to the Esker Foundation in Calgary, Alberta. It included major pieces such as Harvest, works previously included in group shows such as Red Rover from the 2014 Land Marks exhibit organized by the Thames Art Gallery,  and new works representing further development of the aesthetics and concepts represented in these pieces.

Red Rover, one of Barkhouse's major works exhibited in this show, continued the visual themes of wolves and poodles explored in May Contain Wolf, her contribution to the 2012 What is Land exhibition at the Tree Museum in Gravenhurst, Ontario.

In 2005, Barkhouse and Belmore exhibited their collaborative works in the exhibition Sanctuary at the Art Gallery of Peterborough, Ontario. The show later toured to the Tom Thomson Art Gallery in Owen Sound, Ontario.

Selected works and exhibitions

 Hearts of Our People: Native Women Artists, June 2 - August 18, 2019, Minneapolis Institute of Art, Minneapolis, Minnesota, United States.
Reins of Chaos, 2014, Norfolk Arts Centre, Simcoe, Ontario.
Sakahan: International Indigenous Art, May 17 - September 2, 2013. National Gallery of Canada, Ottawa.
Facing the Animal, 2012, Julie Andreyev, Bill Burns, Mary Anne Barkhouse, Vancouver, B.C.
Close Encounters: The Next 400 Years, 2011, Group exhibition featuring 33 Indigenous artists from Canada, the United States, Australia, New Zealand (Aoteara), Finland, and Brazil, Plug IN ICA, Winnipeg, Manitoba.
Boreal Baroque, Mary Anne Barkhouse, 2009, The Robert McLaughlin Gallery, Oshawa, Ontario, Espanade Art Gallery, Medicine Hat, Alberta.
Beaver Tales: Canadian Art and Design, 2008, Toronto Art Centre] Toronto, Ontario.
Early Morning Wolf Stretching Exercises (1993) "Multiplicity: A New Cultural Strategy." Museum of Anthropology at UBC, Vancouver, British Columbia, Canada.
Shades of Red, Pow Wow Gallery, Toronto, Ontario, 1991.
Exposed: Native Women Photographers Group Show, Niroquois Gallery, Brantford, Ontario, 1991.

Collections
Barkhouse's work is included in the collections of the National Gallery of Canada (Harvest, 2009 and Sovereign, 2007), Mendel Art Gallery, Mackenzie Art Gallery, Art Bank of the Canada Council for the Arts, The Robert McLaughlin Gallery, (Grace, 2007) UBC Museum of Anthropology, Macdonald Stewart Art Centre, Banff Centre for the Arts, Archives of Ontario (Persevere, 2006) and the Department of Indian and Northern Affairs.

Bibliography 
 Ahlberg, Yohe J, and Teri Greeves. Hearts of Our People. Native Women Artists. Seattle: University of Washington Press, 2019.
 Hill, Greg A, Candice Hopkins, and Christine Lalonde. Sakahàn: International Indigenous Art. Ottawa: National Gallery of Canada, 2013.

References

1961 births
Artists from Vancouver
Canadian sculptors
Living people
OCAD University alumni
Members of the Royal Canadian Academy of Arts